Sunjong of Goryeo (28 December 1047 – 5 December 1083) (r. 1083) was briefly the 12th ruler of Goryeo.  He was the eldest son of Munjong and the older brother of Seonjong.  He had been confirmed as heir to the throne in 1054.  However, he died within a year of his ascension in 1083.

Family; 

 Father: Munjong of Goryeo (고려 문종)
 Grandfather: Hyeonjong of Goryeo (고려 현종)
 Grandmother: Queen Wonhye  (원혜왕후)
 Mother: Queen Inye (인예왕후)
 Grandfather: Yi Ja-yeon
 Grandmother: Lady, of the Gyeongju Gim clan
 Consorts and their Respective issue(s):

 Queen Jeongui of the Gaeseong Wang clan (정의왕후 왕씨), his first cousin - No issue
 Queen Seonhui of the Gyeongju Gim clan (선희왕후 김씨) - No issue
 Princess Janggyeong of the Incheon Yi clan (장경궁주 이씨) - No issue

See also 
List of Korean monarchs
List of Goryeo people
Goryeo

References

 

1047 births
1083 deaths
11th-century Korean monarchs
People from Kaesong